Ugo Humbert was the defending champion but chose not to defend his title.

Ilya Ivashka won the title after defeating Martin Kližan 6–1, 6–4 in the final.

Seeds

Draw

Finals

Top half

Bottom half

References

External links
Main draw
Qualifying draw

Amex-Istanbul Challenger - Singles
2020 Singles